Drive On may refer to:

 "Drive On" (song), a 1989 song by Brother Beyond
 Drive On (album), a 1975 album by Mott
 "Drive On", a song by Johnny Cash from American Recordings
 Drive On!: A Social History of the Motor Car, a book by automotive journalist L. J. K. Setright